Nasir-ud-Din Haidar Shah (9 September 1803  – 7 July 1837) 
was the second King of Oudh from 19 October 1827 to 7 July 1837.

Life
He was the son of Ghazi-ud-Din Haidar Shah. After the death of Ghazi-ud-din Haidar his son Nasir-ud-din Haider ascended the throne on 20 October 1827 at the age of 25 years. He was fond of women and wine and had believed in astrology and astronomy. He made additions of Darshan Vilas to Claude Martin's house – Farhat Buksh in 1832.

Death
He was poisoned by members of the court. As he had no offspring, there was a succession crisis. The queen mother, Padshah Begum, put Munna Jan on the throne, but he was not acknowledged as a member of the royal family. The British intervened, jailing both Padshah Begum and Munna Jan. They enthroned Nasir-ud-daula, son of the late Nawab Saadat Ali Khan.

References

Notes

External links
 National Informatics Centre, Lucknow – Rulers of Awadh

Nawabs of Awadh
Indian Shia Muslims
Indian people of Iranian descent
People from Lucknow
1837 deaths
1803 births
19th-century Indian monarchs